The 2014 Florida Chief Financial Officer election took place on November 4, 2014, which resulted in the re-election of the Florida Chief Financial Officer. Incumbent Republican Chief Financial Officer Jeff Atwater ran for re-election to a second term in office.

Republican primary

Candidates

Declared
 Jeff Atwater, incumbent Chief Financial Officer

Democratic primary

Candidates

Declared
 Will Rankin, businessman, 11-year U.S. Army Veteran, and former Ohio director of asset management

Withdrew
 Allie Braswell, President of the Central Florida Urban League

Declined
 Jim Waldman, state representative

General election

Candidates
 Jeff Atwater (Republican)
 Will Rankin (Democratic)

Endorsements

Polling

References

External links
Jeff Atwater for Florida Chief Financial Officer
William Rankin for Florida Chief Financial Officer

Chief Financial Officer
Florida Chief Financial Officer
Florida Chief Financial Officer elections